Servia was a town in Adams County, Washington. The GNIS classifies it as a populated place.

When the Milwaukee Railway was built through Servia, the officials named the station after the Kingdom of Serbia. Consequently, the community derived its name from Serbia.

References

Ghost towns in Washington (state)
Geography of Adams County, Washington